John Korsrud (born 1963) is a Canadian composer and jazz trumpeter.

Life 
John Korsrud was born in 1963. He graduated from the University of British Columbia in 1990. Korsrud studied composition with Louis Andriessen at the Royal Conservatory of Music in Amsterdam from 1995 to 1997.

Korsrud has received commissions from the Vancouver Symphony Orchestra, the American Composers Orchestra, The CBC Radio Orchestra, and Dutch ensembles such as Ensemble LOOS, the Tetzepi Bigtet, the Zapp String Quartet, De Ereprijs, among others. in 2010, Korsrud performed on his own trumpet concerto, Come to the Dark Side at Carnegie Hall in with The American Composers Orchestra.

Since 1990, he has led the 18-piece new music/jazz ensemble Hard Rubber Orchestra, with which has appeared in Europe and across Canada, recorded three albums, and in 2005 won the Alcan Arts Award. The Hard Rubber Orchestra has commissioned over 50 works from composers such as Kenny Wheeler, Darcy James Argue, Brad Turner, Scott Good, Linda Bouchard, Rene Lussier and many others. Korsrud also leads the 20-piece Salsa/Latin-Jazz-Orchestra Orquestra Goma Dura, and the 14-piece drum and bass ensemble The Drum & Light Orchestra.

Korsrud has also created large multimedia projects like The Elvis Cantatas (1994, 1996), The Ice Age: The World's First New Music Ice Show (2000, 2010), and Enter/Exit (2005), and The Drum & Light Festival (2008–10). The CBC produced a 70-minute version of Elvis Cantata, entitled Cantata for the King. He won the Leo Award and the Golden Sheaf Award for the music to the film Heroines (2002), and was nominated for the Gemini Award. He won another Leo Award for the film music to Prisoners of Age.

Korsrud is the recipient of the Canada Council's "Victor Martyn Lynch-Staunton Award" (2015), the City of Vancouver Mayor's Award for Music (2012), The Canada Council's Joseph S. Stauffer Prize (2001), and a fellowship from the Italian Civitella Ranieri Foundation (2003). Korsrud has performed as soloist with The Vancouver Symphony and The American Composers Orchestra.

He is currently a member of faculty at Capilano University and Vancouver Community College teaching composition and resides in Vancouver, British Columbia.

Discography 
Hard Rubber Orchestra: Cruel Yet Fair, 1997
Orquestra Goma Dura: Live, 2000
Hard Rubber Orchestra: Rub Harder, 2001
Odd Jobs, Assorted Climaxes, 2005
John Korsrud's Hard Rubber Orchestra: Crush, 2015
John Korsrud's Hard Rubber Orchestra: "Kenny Wheeler: Suite for Hard Rubber Orchestra", 2018

Multimedia projects 
Solstice, 1991
The Elvis Cantatas, 1994, 1996
The Ice Age: The World's First New Music Ice Show, 2000
Enter/Exit, 2005
Drum & Light Festival, 2008, 2009 (2010)
The New Ice Age: New Music Ice Show, 2010

Compositions

Chamber/Orchestra 
Stark Raving, 1994
Zippy Pinhead, 1995
Glurp, 1997
VAP DIST for symphony orchestra, 2000
Lather, 2002
In a Flash for symphony orchestra, 2002
Non Me Domabis, 2003
Gershwin & Fire, 2003
The Shadow of Your Smile, 2005
Wood Eye for symphony orchestra, 2006
Liquid, 2006
Woosh, 2007
Solid, 2007
"Come to the Dark Side" for symphony orchestra, 2010
"Talking Wave", 2012
"Round Midnight", 2013
Jazz Orchestra

Fun for the Whole Family, 1990
Danse Russe, 1990
Ballad for Dave Liebman, 1990
Irk, 1992
Iguana, 1995
Cruel Yet Fair, 1995
Scratching the Surface, 1995
Crush, 2003
Lowest Tide, 2005
Songs from The Nunnery, 2018

Film scores 
Heroines, 2002
Drawing Out the Demons, 2004
Prisoners of Age, 2004
Dark Pines, 2005
Lottery on Ice, 2005
(Post) Modern Times, 2006
Fatherhood Dreams, 2007
As Slow as Possible, 2008
Miss Landmine, 2009
Some Kind of Love, 2014

Compositions for video games 
Mario's Time Machine, 1994

References

External links 
 
 Hard Rubber Orchestra
 

Canadian jazz trumpeters
Male trumpeters
1963 births
Canadian composers
Canadian male composers
Pupils of Louis Andriessen
Canadian male jazz musicians
Living people
Academic staff of Capilano University